The 1988 Summer Olympics torch relay was run from August 23 until September 17, prior to the 1988 Summer Olympics in Seoul. Sohn Kee-chung, Chung Sun-man and Kim Won-tak lit the cauldron at the opening ceremony.

Route in South Korea

References

External links
1988 torch relay via IOC website

Torch Relay, 1988 Summer Olympics
Olympic torch relays